Jone Kuraduadua is a Fijian former professional rugby league footballer who represented Fiji in the 2000 World Cup.

Playing career
Kuraduadua played club football in Bellingen, New South Wales in Australia, playing for the Bellingen Magpies in the Group 2 Rugby League competition.

Kuraduadua started two games on the wing for Fiji at the 2000 World Cup in Great Britain, Ireland and France. He scored a try in Fiji's 38-12 victory over Russia.

References

Living people
Expatriate rugby league players in Australia
Fiji national rugby league team players
Fijian expatriate rugby league players
Fijian expatriates in Australia
Fijian rugby league players
I-Taukei Fijian people
Rugby league wingers
Year of birth missing (living people)